The English Amateur Billiards Championship, organised by the English Amateur Billiards Association (EABA), is a billiards tournament dating back to March 1888.

In the first championship  Hugh Lonsdale of Manchester defeated Joseph Tither of Harpurhey by 500–356 in the final, played on the evening of 28 March 1888 at Orme's Rooms in Manchester.

Norman Dagley of Earl Shilton, Leicestershire holds the record for the most Championship wins with 15, achieved between 1975 and 1984, while also holding the record break with 862 and the highest match average with 147.7 which was achieved in the 1984 final against Bob Close of Hartlepool.

The current and 7 times champion is Rob Halll, of Norton Disney, Lincolnshire.
Hall defeated Darren Kell of Middlesbrough in the 2019 final 1174-666, which was held for the 21st successive year at the Whitworth Institute, Darley Dale, Derbyshire.

The 2020/2021 Championship was suspended due to the Covid19 Pandemic at the semi-final stage, with Hall drawn to play Darren Kell, and 2 times former Champion Phillip Welham of Norfolk to play Hampshire's John Mullane.

References

External links
 English Amateur Billiards Association official website

Competitions in English billiards
Cue sports in the United Kingdom